The 1972 Cincinnati Bearcats football team represented University of Cincinnati during the 1972 NCAA University Division football season. The Bearcats, led by head coach Ray Callahan, participated as independent and played their home games at Nippert Stadium.

Schedule

References

Game Films
1972 Cincinnati - Indiana State Football Game Film
1972 Cincinnati - Colorado Football Game Film
1972 Cincinnati - Villanova Football Game Film
1972 Cincinnati - Ohio U Football Game Film
1972 Cincinnati - Louisville Football Game Film
1972 Cincinnati - Miami (Oh) Football Game Film, Reel 1
1972 Cincinnati - Miami (Oh) Football Game Film, Reel 2
1972 Cincinnati - Miami (Oh) Football Game Film, Reel 3
1972 Cincinnati - Miami (Oh) Football Game Film, Reel 4
1972 Cincinnati - Miami (Oh) Football Game Film, Reel 5

Cincinnati
Cincinnati Bearcats football seasons
Cincinnati Bearcats football